AHOD may refer to:

 A Handful of Dust, a novel by Evelyn Waugh published in 1934
 A Handful of Dust (band), a New Zealand band